Pinalitus atomarius is a true bug. The species is found in the Palearctic.It feeds on Picea abies.

References
Meyer-Dür, L. R., 1843 Verzeichnis der in der Schweiz einhimischen Rhynchoten (Hemiptera Linn.). Erstes Heft. Die Familie der Capsini. Jent und Gassmann, Solothurn. X + 11–116 + IV pp., 7 pls.

External links
Miridae dk

Miridae